The Hargis House is a historic house built in 1920 which was listed on the National Register of Historic Places in 1996.  It is located at 300 E. Cedar St. in Franklin, Kentucky.

It is a two-story house built of formed stone, and has a one-story front porch with rusticated columns.  It has been described as Prairie School in style and as an American Foursquare house, although it does not appear to be a pure example of either.

References

National Register of Historic Places in Simpson County, Kentucky
Prairie School architecture in Kentucky
Houses completed in 1920
1920 establishments in Kentucky
Houses on the National Register of Historic Places in Kentucky
American Foursquare architecture
Houses in Simpson County, Kentucky
Franklin, Kentucky